The 26th edition of the annual Hypo-Meeting took place on June 3 and June 4, 2000 in Götzis, Austria. The track and field competition, featuring a decathlon (men) and a heptathlon (women) event, was part of the 2000 IAAF World Combined Events Challenge.

Men's Decathlon

Schedule

June 3 

June 4

Records

Results

Women's Heptathlon

Schedule

June 3

June 4

Records

Results

Notes

See also
2000 Decathlon Year Ranking
Athletics at the 2000 Summer Olympics – Men's decathlon
Athletics at the 2000 Summer Olympics – Women's heptathlon

References
 decathlon2000
 IAAF results
 athledunet 
 decathlonfans
 IAAF info

2000
Hypo-Meeting
Hypo-Meeting